Eva Sylvia Waldemarsson (November 16, 1903 – May 24, 1986) was a Swedish writer, mainly known for her historical novels.

The daughter of a wholesaler in Rinkaby, she taught for several years after completing her education. She later worked as an office assistant in Kristianstad.

Her first novel Himlavargen, published in 1959, was named best novel in Scania province. Her novels are written in local speech.

Selected works 
 Himlaland, novel (1961)
 Madonneleken, novel (1967)
 Stadsrådinnan, novel (1982)
 Min far sköt en stork, novel (1984)

References

Further reading
 

1903 births
1986 deaths
People from Kristianstad Municipality
Swedish historical novelists
Swedish women novelists
Writers from Scania